Crypsityla is a genus of moths in the family Geometridae erected by William Warren in 1900.

References

Sterrhinae
Taxa named by William Warren (entomologist)
Geometridae genera